Eeltsje Boates Folkertsma (13 November 1893, Ferwert – 1 January 1968, Franeker) was a West Frisian language writer and a Protestant skilled as a translator.  He worked with Geart Aeilco Wumkes in translating the Old Testament (West Frisian:Alde Testamint) in 1943.

The major work was carried out by Wumkes with the translation of the Bible in West Frisian with the New Testament (West Frisian: Nije Testamint) published in 1933 and the Old Testament (West Frisian: Alde Testamint) in 1943.  The complete Bible was published in 1943 (West Frisian: Bibel).

External links
Wumkes.nl mei ûnder oaren de Stads- en Dorpskroniek (in West Frisian)

1893 births
1968 deaths
Dutch Calvinist and Reformed theologians
People from Ferwerderadiel
Translators of the Bible into Frisian
Translators to West Frisian
West Frisian-language writers
20th-century translators